Banguele is a village in the Lobaye region in the Central African Republic southwest of the capital, Bangui.

Nearby towns and villages include Bomango(6.0 nm), Tobale (6.0 nm), Boukoko (4.1 nm), Bamango(9.9 nm), Mongounda (7.5 nm), Bonguele (7.3 nm), Mbi (7.2 nm), Yakoussou (3.2 nm), Kapa (2.8 nm), Zanga (2.8 nm) and Mbaiki (2.0 nm).

References

Populated places in Lobaye